Ighli Vannucchi (born 5 August 1977) is a retired Italian footballer who played as a midfielder. A player with notable technical ability and vision, he played mainly for mid-table Serie A clubs, as well as in the Serie B.

Club career
Vannucchi was born in Prato.

Empoli
He joined first Empoli in their 2002-2003 campaign, and returned to the Tuscan side in January 2004 after an unimpressive six-month stay at Palermo. He was the team captain and was considered one of the most representative players of the squad.

Spezia
Vannucchi was released on 1 July 2010 and in October signed by Spezia. On 27 June 2011, he signed a new one-year contract.

International career
Vannucchi has represented Italy at U-21 level, winning the UEFA U-21 Championship in 2000, also representing the Italy U-23 side at the 2000 Summer Olympics.

References

1977 births
Living people
People from Prato
Association football midfielders
Italian footballers
Serie A players
Serie B players
Serie C players
Italy under-21 international footballers
Footballers at the 2000 Summer Olympics
Olympic footballers of Italy
Empoli F.C. players
U.S. Salernitana 1919 players
Palermo F.C. players
Venezia F.C. players
S.S.D. Lucchese 1905 players
Spezia Calcio players
Sportspeople from the Province of Prato
Footballers from Tuscany